"The Late Captain Pierce" is an episode from M*A*S*H. It was the fourth episode of the fourth season and aired on October 3, 1975 (first-run) and April 6, 1976 (repeat). It was written by Glen Charles and Les Charles and directed by Alan Alda.

Guest cast is Richard Masur as Lt. "Digger" Detmuller, Eldon Quick as Captain Pratt, Sherry Steffens as Nurse Able and Kellye Nakahara as Nurse Baker.

Overview
A bureaucratic mistake leaves the army thinking that Hawkeye Pierce is dead, and he simultaneously enjoys the lack of responsibility that comes from being legally deceased, with trying to contact his father back in Maine to tell him he's still alive.

Synopsis
The episode opens with Klinger (filling in for Radar, who is on leave in Seoul) waking up B.J. Hunnicutt with a midnight call from Hawkeye's father.  Hawkeye is informed of the call and accompanies B.J.and Klinger to the phone, but all Hunnicutt hears from Hawkeye's father is "how?" and "why?" before the phone line is knocked out.

At daybreak, Lieutenant "Digger" Detmuller (Richard Masur) arrives at the camp looking for Captain Pierce, and is surprised to find him still alive.  Detmuller shows Pierce his own death certificate, explaining that he works for Quartermaster Corps morgue detail and is there to collect Pierce's body.  Realizing that his father thinks he's dead (which is why he asked to talk to B.J.), Hawkeye rushes to try to contact his father and reassure him that he is still alive, and Colonel Potter orders Klinger to do what he can to correct the snafu.

At first, Hawkeye accepts the situation with good humor, using his "death" as an excuse to get out of camp duties and Major Burns' body-building class; B.J. decides to throw Hawkeye a wake in the Swamp saying, "What kind of a friend would I be to let you pass away without a party?", and Hawkeye delivers his own eulogy with the guests given 20 minutes for rebuttal.  But through it all Hawkeye worries about his father's grieving.  His inner frustration emerges when Klinger informs him his mail was stopped at HQ, and is later exacerbated when Burns gleefully informs Hawkeye that he has been redlined on the company payroll list, which provokes Hawkeye to jump Burns.  To make matters even worse, security for General Eisenhower's visit to Korea is clamping down on all stateside communication, making contact with Pierce's father nearly impossible.

Eventually Potter gets help from HQ in the person of Captain Pratt (Eldon Quick), who promises to fix the error, but the paperwork is voluminous and the protocol involved is time consuming.  In the meantime Pierce, with no money or mail, will have to remain, in Pratt's words, an "unperson."  In a fit of anger, Hawkeye decides to accept his fate and desert as a suppositious cadaver; despite Digger's protest that he can't take passengers, Hawkeye climbs on board Digger's cadaver bus and prepares to leave saying, "I'm not a passenger, I'm cargo."  As a deluge of wounded arrive, B.J. attempts to dissuade Hawkeye from leaving, but citing Trapper and Henry's respective departures, Hawkeye argues that the wounded will keep coming whether he's there or not.  The bus drives off, but stops just outside camp in front of Rosie's Bar; Hawkeye grudgingly climbs out the back door and walks back to camp.

The episode ends with Hawkeye on the phone talking to his father, casually explaining how he's still dead as far as the Army is concerned and asking if he could be sent his allowance again.

Production

 This was the first script sold by writers Glen Charles and Les Charles, who went on to produce and write for several sitcoms before co-creating Cheers.
 Although listed in the opening credits, neither Loretta Swit (Margaret) nor Gary Burghoff (Radar) appear in this episode.
 This is one of the few times following the departure of Wayne Rogers and McLean Stevenson from the series that their characters are referenced.
Backdate November 1952 [Episode 3/16 "Bulletin Board"] Dwight Eisenhower vows to go Korea if elected President; in this episode President elect Eisenhower visited Korea in December 1952

References

External links
 

M*A*S*H (season 4) episodes
1975 American television episodes
Television episodes directed by Alan Alda